Ridgewood is an unincorporated community located in Putnam County, Florida, United States. Situated two miles east of Welaka and 3 1/4 miles southwest of Pomona Park, it is located at latitude 29° 28' 13.8432 North, longitude 81° 38' 43.4400 West. First settled in 1871, by 1883 Ridgewood had a population of 100 with a post office, one store, two steam saw mills and a public school. The hard freezes of the 1890s destroyed most of the citrus crops in the area and as a result the community declined. In the years ahead, a forest fire was said to have destroyed the remainder of the town during the 1920s.
All that remains of Ridgewood is a cemetery, now known as the Welaka-Georgetown Cemetery but was once known as Ridgewood Cemetery. Putnam County records show the first burial was recorded in 1917. Mail ran on Monday, Wednesday, Friday and Saturday. Unimproved land sold from $5 to $30 per acre. Application to start a post office by Franklin B Parse was submitted May 30, 1883 to the United States Postal Service, approved and appointed June 15, 1883

Post Office discontinued on November 15, 1900, mail sent to Fairview

References

Unincorporated communities in Florida
Unincorporated communities in Putnam County, Florida